, also known as NBS, is a Japanese broadcast network affiliated with the Fuji News Network and Fuji Network System. Their headquarters are located in Nagano Prefecture.

Headquarters
 131-7 Okada-machi Nagano-city, NAGANO 380-8633 JAPAN
 Telephone Number:+81-26-227-3000

History
1 April 1969: it was set up second broadcasting station of Nagano Prefecture.
1 October 2006 digital terrestrial television was started (Utsukushigahara Main Station, Zenkoji-daira Station, Matsumoto Station, Okaya-Suwa Station, Ina Station and Iida Station).

Programs
NBS Super News
NBS News

Analog stations
Utsukushigahara (main station) JOLH-TV 38ch
Iida 40ch
Zenkoji-daira 42ch
Okaya-Suwa 47ch
Matsumoto 42ch
Ina 57ch

Digital stations(ID:8)
Utsukushigahara (main station) JOLH-DTV 15ch
Iida 49ch
Zenkoji-daira 34ch
Okaya-Suwa 49ch
Matsumoto 26ch
Ina 26ch

Rival stations
Shin-etsu Broadcasting (SBC)
TV. Shinshu (TSB)
Asahi Broadcasting Nagano (abn)

Other links
Nagano Broadcasting Systems

Fuji News Network
Television stations in Japan
Companies based in Nagano Prefecture
Television channels and stations established in 1969
Mass media in Nagano (city)